New Faces is a 1954 American film adaptation of the musical revue New Faces of 1952 directed by Harry Horner with sketches directed by John Beal. Filmed in Cinemascope and Eastmancolor it was released by 20th Century Fox on March 6, 1954.

The film is sometimes referred to as New Faces of 1952, from the original Broadway show's title.

Plot summary 
The film was essentially a reproduction of the stage revue with a thin plot added. This involved a producer and performer (Ronny Graham) in financial trouble on opening night. A wealthy Texan, whose daughter is in the show,  offers to help out on the condition that he finds the show to be of high-enough quality and commercial potential to warrant the investment. Meanwhile, Clary locks a bill collector in a dressing room until the show is finished and he can collect the money. If the Texan performer's father is not impressed with her talent, she will be expected to return to Texas rather than pursuing her show-business career. Her attempts to impress onstage are hampered by the fact that her signature song is repeatedly cut short so that she can introduce the next act. But at the end of the show, the backer is duly impressed and his daughter not only has her talent validated, but announces that she will be marrying the other cast member with whom she's in love.

Background
Ronny Graham, Eartha Kitt, Robert Clary, Alice Ghostley, June Carroll, Virginia De Luce, Carol Lawrence, Patricia Hammerlee, Paul Lynde, and Bill Millikin reprised their stage roles.

The sketches include Lynde's famous "Trip of the Month" monologue, and a Death of a Salesman parody with Graham, Lynde and Ghostley, written by Mel Brooks, who is billed in the credits as "Melvin Brooks." In a March 2012 appearance at the American Cinematheque, Brooks said the sketch was originally written for another revue, "Curtain Going Up," but that show closed during its tryout in Philadelphia. However, Sillman had seen the show and asked him if he could import the sketch for "New Faces." Brooks readily agreed and thanked him for "saving my Broadway career." He added that Arthur Miller came to a performance and afterwards sent him a note which read, "I am not upset. But I should be."

Cast 

Starring
Ronny Graham as Himself
Eartha Kitt as Herself
Robert Clary as Himself
Alice Ghostley as Herself

Under-billed cast
June Carroll as Herself
Virginia de Luce as Virginia de Luce Clayborn 
Paul Lynde as Himself
Bill Mullikin as Himself
Rosemary O'Reilly as Herself
Allen Conroy as Herself
Jimmy Russell as Himself
George Smiley as Himself
Polly Ward as Herself
Carol Lawrence as Herself
Johnny Laverty as Himself
Elizabeth Logue as Herself
Faith Burwell as Herself
Clark Ranger as Himself
Henry Kulky as Mr. Dee 
Charles Watts as Mr. Clayborn

Soundtrack 
The song order was changed and expanded and some songs were omitted, or had their lyrics updated. The song "Natty Puts her Hair Up" was omitted; however, an abridged version was used as an instrumental in a dance routine.  The song "Don't Fall Asleep" was omitted.  The song "Love is a Simple thing" omitted the final verse, that being  the Charles Addams character verse, because it was too outdated.  Also, an extra verse was added to "Lizzie Borden".  Some of the lines in "Monotonous" were replaced and updated, omitting the line "Ike Likes Me", and being replaced with writing the "Dragnet" theme instead.

Eartha Kitt (EP)

Full title Eartha Kitt Sings Songs from the Edward L. Alperson CinemaScope Production of Leonard Sillman's "New Faces", this was a 45 speed 7" extended play released around 1954 to market on the commercial success of the film's star, Eartha Kitt, after the film's release. The extended play was released by RCA Victor with the catalog number EPA-557. It was later issued in the United Kingdom in 1956, and in Germany perhaps around 1960.

Track listing
Track list and credits adapted from liner notes of original release. Track lengths are approximate and based on releases of the songs on different versions of That Bad Eartha.

Release history

References

External links 

1954 films
1954 musical comedy films
American musical comedy films
20th Century Fox films
Films based on musicals
Films directed by Harry Horner
Films scored by Raoul Kraushaar
1950s English-language films
1950s American films